The 1997 Giro d'Italia was the 80th edition of the Giro. It began on 17 May with a mass-start stage that began and ended in Venice. The race came to a close on 8 June with a mass-start stage that ended in the Italian city of Milan. Eighteen teams entered the race that was won by the Italian Ivan Gotti of the  team. Second and third were the Russian rider Pavel Tonkov and Italian Giuseppe Guerini.

In the race's other classifications,  rider Chepe González won the mountains classification, Mario Cipollini of the Saeco team won the points classification, and  rider Dimitri Konyshev won the intergiro classification. Kelme – Costa Blanca finished as the winners of the Trofeo Fast Team classification, ranking each of the eighteen teams contesting the race by lowest cumulative time. The other team classification, the Trofeo Super Team classification, where the teams' riders are awarded points for placing within the top twenty in each stage and the points are then totaled for each team was won by Saeco.

Teams

Eighteen teams were invited by the race organizers to participate in the 1997 edition of the Giro d'Italia. Each team sent a squad of ten riders, which meant that the race started with a peloton of 180 cyclists. From the riders that began the race, 110 made it to the finish in Milan.

The eighteen teams that took part in the race were:

Route and stages

The route for the 1997 Giro d'Italia was unveiled by race director Carmine Castellano on 9 November 1996 in Milan. It contained two time trial events, all of which were individual. There were ten stages containing high mountains, of which three had summit finishes: stage 5, to Monte Terminillo; stage 14, to Breuil-Cervinia; and stage 20, to Passo del Tonale. The organizers chose to include one rest day. When compared to the previous year's race, the race was  shorter, contained the same amount of rest days and stages, as well as one more individual time trial.

Classification leadership

Four different jerseys were worn during the 1997 Giro d'Italia. The leader of the general classification – calculated by adding the stage finish times of each rider, and allowing time bonuses for the first three finishers on mass-start stages – wore a pink jersey. This classification is the most important of the race, and its winner is considered as the winner of the Giro.

For the points classification, which awarded a purple (or cyclamen) jersey to its leader, cyclists were given points for finishing a stage in the top 15; additional points could also be won in intermediate sprints. The green jersey was awarded to the mountains classification leader. In this ranking, points were won by reaching the summit of a climb ahead of other cyclists. Each climb was ranked as either first, second or third category, with more points available for higher category climbs. The Cima Coppi, the race's highest point of elevation, awarded more points than the other first category climbs. The Cima Coppi for this Giro was the Pordoi Pass and was first climbed by the Colombian José Jaime González. The intergiro classification was marked by a blue jersey. The calculation for the intergiro is similar to that of the general classification, in each stage there is a midway point that the riders pass through a point and where their time is stopped. As the race goes on, their times compiled and the person with the lowest time is the leader of the intergiro classification and wears the blue jersey. Although no jersey was awarded, there was also one classification for the teams, in which the stage finish times of the best three cyclists per team were added; the leading team was the one with the lowest total time.

The rows in the following table correspond to the jerseys awarded after that stage was run.

Final standings

General classification

Points classification

Mountains classification

Intergiro classification

Trofeo Fast Team classification

Trofeo Super Team classification

References

Citations

 
1997
Giro d'Italia
Giro d'Italia
Giro d'Italia
Giro d'Italia